The Benguet Provincial Board is the Sangguniang Panlalawigan (provincial legislature) of the Philippine province of Benguet.

The members are elected via plurality-at-large voting: the province is divided into two districts, the first sending four and the second sending six members. The number of members the electorate votes for and the number of members elected depends on the number of members the district sends. The vice governor is the ex officio presiding officer, and only votes to break ties. The vice governor is elected via the plurality voting system province-wide.

Seat apportionment

List of members
An additional three ex officio members are the presidents of the provincial chapters of the Association of Barangay Captains, the Councilors' League, the Sangguniang Kabataan
provincial president; the municipal and city (if applicable) presidents of the Association of Barangay Captains, Councilor's League and Sangguniang Kabataan, shall elect amongst themselves their provincial presidents which shall be their representatives at the board.

Current members 
These are the members after the 2019 local elections and 2018 barangay and SK elections:

 Vice Governor: Johnny Waguis (PDP–Laban)

Vice Governor

1st District

 Municipalities: Bokod, Itogon, Kabayan, Sablan, Tuba

2nd District

 Municipalities: Atok, Bakun, Buguias, Kapangan, Kibungan, La Trinidad, Mankayan, Tublay

References 

Provincial boards in the Philippines
Politics of Benguet